Car spotting is a service in rail transport operations.

A 1920 book on railroad freight defines the term as follows:

"Spotting service is the service beyond a reasonably convenient
point of interchange between road haul or connecting
carriers , industrial plant tracks  and includes: (a) One
placement of a loaded car which the road haul or connecting
carrier has transported, or (b) The taking out of a loaded
car from a particular location in the plant for transportation
by road haul or connecting carrier, (c) The handling of the
empty car in the reverse direction."

See also
Car spotting (positioning)

References

Rail transport operations